Dardanus (Dardanos) was an ancient city in the Troad. It was sometimes called Dardania, a term used also for the district around it. Pliny the Elder called it Dardanium.

Location 

At the time of the geographer Strabo, the city of Dardanus stood one mile south of the headland of Dardanis, the point at which the Hellespont, which today is called "the Dardanelles" after the city, begins to narrow. Abydos lay about 70 stadia (13–14 kilometres) to the north and Rhoeteum about the same distance to the south. The acropolis has been identified with the top of Şehitlik Batarya.

History 

The town that Strabo knew was a colony of Aeolians and was distinct from the by then vanished Dardanus or Dardania presented in the Iliad as situated at the foot of Mount Ida and reputed to be named after Dardanus, who founded it earlier than the founding of Ilium.

The historical city was one of those that the Achaemenid Empire reduced in 497 BC in the course of its suppression of the Ionian Revolt. Nearly two centuries later, the taking by surprise of Spartan ships on that coast led to the Athenian victory of the Battle of Abydos in 411 BC. Dardanus was also the place where in 85 BC Sulla and Mithridates VI of Pontus met and agreed on the Treaty of Dardanos.

Bishopric 
Dardanus became a Christian bishopric, a suffragan of the metropolitan see of Cyzicus, the capital of the Roman province of Hellespontus. The names of several its ancient bishops are known. Paulus, unable because of ill health to sign personally the acts of the Council of Ephesus in 431 got Bishop Foscus of Thyatira to sign on his behalf. Petrus took part in the Council of Chalcedon in 451 and was one of the bishops of Hellespontus who in 458 wrote a joint letter to Byzantine Emperor Leo I the Thracian regarding the murder of Patriarch Proterius of Alexandria. Phocas attended the synod called by Patriarch Menas of Constantinople in 536. Strategius took part in the Second Council of Nicaea in 787. Ioannes was at the Photian Council of Constantinople (879).

No longer a residential bishopric, Dardanus is today listed by the Catholic Church as a titular see.

References

Catholic titular sees in Asia
Trojans
Cities in ancient Troad
Populated places in ancient Troad
Former populated places in Turkey
Aeolian colonies
Ancient Greek archaeological sites in Turkey
Defunct dioceses of the Ecumenical Patriarchate of Constantinople